Carmen Diana Deere (born August 1, 1945) is an American feminist economist who is an expert on land policy and agrarian reform, rural social movements, and gender in Latin American development. She has conducted extensive research on access to land, economic autonomy of rural women, and property rights in Latin America. Deere's research and work, often carried out with Magdalena León de Leal, have contributed to promoting the changes that have taken place since 1980 in the vast majority of countries in Latin America with respect to the reform of land laws, civil codes, and family matters, as well as the approval of new legislation that recognizes the equal rights of women and men, including their property rights. Deere is Professor Emeritus of Latin American studies and Food Resources Economics at the University of Florida and Professor Emeritus of FLACSO-Ecuador. She was honored with the Silvert Award in 2018.

Early life and education
Carmen Diana Deere was born in Carlsbad, New Mexico, August 1, 1945. She received a BA in International Politics and Economics from the University of Colorado, an MA in Development studies from The Fletcher School at Tufts University (1968), and a Ph.D. in Agricultural economics from the University of California, Berkeley (1978).

Career and research
From 1992 to 2004, she served as Director of Latin American studies and the Center for Latin America, Caribbean and Latino Studies at the University of Massachusetts Amherst. From 2004 to 2011, she was a professor of agricultural economics and Latin American studies at the University of Florida where from 2004 to 2009, she directed the Center for Latin American Studies. She has also been a consultant for the United Nations Development Programme on Brazil (2004) and has participated in various programs on gender in Latin American universities. Between 2009 and 2010, she was a visiting researcher at the Latin American Faculty of Social Sciences-Ecuador where she conducted a national study on gender and asset ownership.

Deere has been the president of the Latin American Studies Association, the organization that brings together experts in Latin America from all disciplines and various occupational areas throughout the world with more than 12,000 members, and the New England Council of Latin American Studies (NECLAS). She currently participates in the editorial committee of several specialized journals such as the Journal of Agrarian Change, and associate editor of the journal, Feminist Economics.

She has received numerous research grants, including from the Ford Foundation, to carry out a comparative study on gender and land rights in Latin America and the publications of the results (1997-2001), as well as from the World Bank, to carry out research on women and land rights in Latin America. From 2013 to 2015, funded by UN Women, Deere conducted international research, the "Gender Asset Gap Project," focused on improving statistics on gender and assets as well as analysis of women's intra-household bargaining power.

Deere currently participates in the "International Panel on Social Progress" (IPSP), convened by Amartya Sen and continues to develop research in Ecuador (FLACSO) and in Cuba with the University of Havana within the collaboration project in the agricultural sector and the international economy: challenges and opportunities for Cuba and the United States.

Deere was influenced by Stephen Resnick and Richard D. Wolff, Marxist economists, and her early work with Magdalena León de Leal.

Awards and honours 
 1996, Bacardi Family Eminent Scholar Chair in Latin American Studies, University of Florida
 1997, Chancellor's Medal, University of Massachusetts Amherst
 2000, Fulbright-Hays scholar, Federal University of Rio de Janeiro
 2018, Silvert Award

Award-winning books and papers 
 2006, James A. Robertson Prize, Conference on Latin American History, for "Liberalism and Married Women’s Property Rights", best article, The Hispanic American Historical Review, 2005 
 2003, Bryce Wood Book Award, Latin American Studies Association, for Empowering Women 
 2002, Best Book Award, NECLAS, for Empowering Women 
 2002, Best Book Award, Latino Literary Hall of Fame, History Division, for Empowering Women 
 2002, Best Book Award, Cuban Academy of Sciences, Social Science Division, for Historias Agrarias 
 2001, Best Book Award, University of Havana, for Historias Agrarias
 1998, Joseph P. Criscenti Best Article Award, NECLAS, for "Here Come the Yankees!"
 1991, Best Book Award, NECLAS, for Household and Class Relations

Selected works

 Deere, Carmen Diana (1977). The development of capitalism in agriculture and the division of labor by sex: a study of the northern peruvian sierra. Michigan: University Microfilms International.
 Deere, Carmen Diana; Leal, Magdalena León de (1980). Mujer y capitalismo agrario: estudio de cuatro regiones colombianas. Asociación Colombiana para el Estudio de la Población.
 Deere, Carmen Diana; Leal, Magdalena León de (1982). Women in Andean agriculture: peasant production and rural wage employment in Colombia and Peru. International Labour Office. .
 Leal, Magdalena León de; Deere, Carmen Diana; Marulanda, Nohra Rey de (1982). Debate sobre la mujer en América Latina y el Caribe: Sociedad subordinación y feminismo. Asociación Colombiana para el Estudio de la Población. vol. I, La Realidad Colombiana; vol. II, Las Trabajadoras del Agro; vol. III, Sociedad, Subordinación y Femenismo. Bogotá: Asociación Colombiana para el Estudio de la Población.
 CIERA Rural Women's Research Team y Carmen Diana Deere (1984). "La Mujer en las Cooperativas Agropecuarias en Nicaragua". Managua: Centro de Investigación y Estudio de la Reforma Agraria.
 Deere, Carmen Diana y José Luis Coraggio (1986). Expanded Spanish collection, "La Transición Difícil: El Desarrollo de los Pequeños Países Periféricos". México: Siglo XXI, 1986); reimpreso, Managua: Editorial Vanguardia, 1987.
 Fagen, Richard R.; Deere, Carmen Diana (1986). Transition and Development: Problems of Third World Socialism. Monthly Review Press. . (Text)
 Deere, Carmen Diana y Magdalena León (1986). La Mujer y la Política Agraria en América Latina. Bogotá: Siglo XXI.
 Deere, Carmen Diana (1986). "Tough Row to Hoe: Women in the Nicaraguan Agricultural Cooperatives". San Francisco: Institute for Food and Development Policy.
 Deere, Carmen Diana (1987). Rural women and state policy: feminist perspectives on Latin American agricultural development. Westview Press. . (Text)
 Deere, Carmen Diana; Antrobus, Peggy (1990). In the shadows of the sun: Caribbean development alternatives and U.S. policy. Westview Press. . (Text)
 Deere, Carmen Diana (1 January 1990). Household and Class Relations: Peasants and Landlords in Northern Peru. University of California Press. . (Text)
 Deere, Carmen Diana (1 January 1992). Familia y relaciones de clase: el campesinado y los terratenientes en la sierra norte del Perú, 1900-1980. Instituto de Estudios Peruanos. . (Text)
 Deere, Carmen Diana, Niurka Pérez, Cary Torres, Myriam García y Ernel González (1998). Guines, Santo Domingo and Majibacoa: sobre sus historias agrarias. Havana: Editorial de Ciencias Sociales.
 Leal, Magdalena León de; Deere, Carmen Diana; Elizabeth García; V, Julio César Trujillo (1999). Género y derechos de las mujeres a la tierra en Ecuador. Consejo Nacional de las Mujeres. (Text)
 Deere, Carmen Diana; Leal, Magdalena León de (1999). Mujer y tierra en Guatemala. AVANCSO Asociación para el Avance de Ciencias Sociales en Guatemala. (Text)
 Deere, Carmen Diana; Leal, Magdalena León de (1 January 1999). Towards a gendered analysis of the Brazilian agrarian reform. Center for Latin American & Caribbean Studies, University of Connecticut. (Text)
 Deere, Carmen Diana; Leal, Magdalena León de (1997). Women and land rights in the Latin American neo-liberal counter-reforms. Women in International Development, Michigan State University. (Text)
 Deere, Carmen Diana; Leal, Magdalena León de (1 January 2000). Género, propiedad y empoderamiento: tierra, Estado y mercado en América Latina. TM Editores : UN, Facultad de Ciencias Humanas. . (Text)
 Deere, Carmen Diana; Leal, Magdalena León de (2001 - 2014). Empowering Women: Land and Property Rights in Latin America. University of Pittsburgh Press. .
 Baranyi, Stephen, Manuel Morales y Carmen Diana Deere, (2004). Land and development in Latin America: Openings for policy research. Ottawa: The North – South Institute: International development.
 Deere, Carmen Diana; Leal, Magdalena León de (2002). Género, propiedad y Empoderamiento: tierra, estado y mercado en América Latina. PUEG. . (Text)
 Deer, C. D. (2005). The feminization of agriculture? Economic restructuring in rural Latin America. .
 Deere, Carmen Diana y Cheryl Doss, eds. (2007). Women and the Distribution of Wealth. London and New York City: Routledge.
 Deere, Carmen Diana y Frederick S. Royce, eds. (2009). Rural social movements in Latin America: Organizing for sustainable livehoods. Florida: University Press of Florida.

References

External links
 Carmen Diana Deere's CV at University of Florida Center for Latin American Studies

1945 births
Living people
People from Carlsbad, New Mexico
University of Colorado Boulder alumni
The Fletcher School at Tufts University alumni
University of California, Berkeley alumni
Feminist economists
American economists
American feminist writers
20th-century American non-fiction writers
21st-century American non-fiction writers
20th-century American women writers
21st-century American women writers
Gender studies academics
Latin Americanists